The Alishan Museum is a museum in Alishan National Scenic Area, Alishan Township, Chiayi County, Taiwan.

History
The museum was established in 1935 and renovated in 2007.

Architecture
The museum was built using cypress woods originating from the area around the museum.

Exhibitions
The museum exhibits the history of logging in Alishan, original culture in the region, preservation efforts of the roads around the forest and the development of Alishan Forest Railway.

Transportation
The museum is accessible within walking distance northwest Zhaoping Station of Alishan Forest Railway.

See also
 List of museums in Taiwan

References

1935 establishments in Taiwan
Museums established in 1935
Museums in Chiayi County